Dukagjin Pupovci (born 5 June 1964) is a Kosovo-Albanian professor, education expert and a critic of the education system in Kosovo. He has contributed to the development of important policy documents and has co-authored numerous studies and articles in the field of education and research in Kosovo.

Pupovci holds a Doctor of Philosophy degree in mathematics and was a lecturer at numerous universities, including the Universiteti i Prishtinës in Pristina. He was the executive director of the Kosovo Education Center from 2000 to 2021. He was Deputy Minister of Education in the Government of Kosovo from April 2021 to December 2022.

References

Place of birth missing (living people)
1964 births
20th-century European people
21st-century European people
Academic staff of the University of Pristina
Kosovo Albanians
Albanian mathematicians
Living people